José Turra was a Chilean boxer. He competed in the men's flyweight event at the 1928 Summer Olympics. At the 1928 Summer Olympics, he lost to Nikolaos Fexis of Greece.

References

External links
 

Year of birth missing
Possibly living people
Chilean male boxers
Olympic boxers of Chile
Boxers at the 1928 Summer Olympics
Place of birth missing
Flyweight boxers
20th-century Chilean people